Alexis Hall (born 23 January 1980) is an English actress, singer and model from Manchester.

Career
She played the role of Precious, a model agency scout in the television series Hollyoaks: In the City.

Hollyoaks: In the City is a spin-off of the Channel 4 television series Hollyoaks. It is set in the city of Liverpool, not the usual Hollyoaks setting of Chester.

The show also serves as a continuation to 2005's Hollyoaks: Let Loose which followed the lives of ex-Hollyoaks characters Ben Davies and Lisa Hunter.

External links
 
 Hollyoaks website

1980 births
Living people
English television actresses
Place of birth missing (living people)
English female models
21st-century English women singers
21st-century English singers